The 2020 UT Arlington Mavericks softball team represented the University of Texas at Arlington in the 2020 NCAA Division I softball season. The Mavericks played their home games at Allan Saxe Field. The Cajuns were led by third year head coach Peejay Brun.

On March 12, the Sun Belt Conference announced the indefinite suspension of all spring athletics, including softball, due to the increasing risk of the COVID-19 pandemic.  On March 16, the Sun Belt formally announced the cancelation of all spring sports, thus ending their season definitely.

Preseason

Sun Belt Conference Coaches Poll
The Sun Belt Conference Coaches Poll was released on January 29, 2020. UT Arlington was picked to finish third in the Sun Belt Conference with 77 votes.

Preseason All-Sun Belt team
Summer Ellyson (LA, SR, Pitcher)
Megan Kleist (LA, SR, Pitcher)
Julie Rawls (LA, SR, Catcher)
Reagan Wright (UTA, SR, Catcher)
Katie Webb (TROY, SR, 1st Base)
Kaitlyn Alderink (LA, SR, 2nd Base)
Hailey Mackay (TXST, SR, 3rd Base)
Alissa Dalton (LA, SR, Shortstop)
Jayden Mount (ULM, SR, Shortstop)
Whitney Walton (UTA, SR, Shortstop)
Tara Oltmann (TXST, JR, Shortstop)
Courtney Dean (CCU, JR, Outfield)
Mekhia Freeman (GASO, SR, Outfield)
Sarah Hudek (LA, SR, Outfield)
Raina O'Neal (LA, JR, Outfield)
Bailey Curry (LA, JR, Designated Player/1st Base)

National Softball Signing Day

Roster

Coaching staff

Schedule and results

Schedule Source:
*Rankings are based on the team's current ranking in the NFCA/USA Softball poll.

References

UT Arlington
UT Arlington Mavericks softball
UT Arlington Mavericks softball seasons